Adelphicos quadrivirgatum, the Middle American burrowing snake, is a species of dipsadine colubrid snake, endemic to Mexico and Central America.

Geographic range
A. quadrivirgatum is found in Belize, Guatemala, Honduras, Nicaragua, and in the Mexican  states of Chiapas, Hidalgo, Oaxaca, Puebla, Querétaro, San Luis Potosí, and Tamaulipas.

Description
A. quadrivirgatum is a small snake. Dorsally, it is pale reddish brown, with four or five blackish narrow stripes. Ventrally, it is whitish with a brown stripe along the middle of the tail.

Diet
A. quadrivirgatum preys mainly on earthworms.

Reproduction
A. quadrivirgatum is oviparous.

References

Further reading
Boulenger GA (1894). Catalogue of the Snakes in the British Museum (Natural History). Volume II., Containing the Conclusion of the Colubridæ Aglyphæ. London: Trustees of the British Museum (Natural History). (Taylor and Francis, printers). xi + 382 pp. + Plates I-XX. (Atractus quadrivirgatus, pp. 312–313).
Heimes, Peter (2016). Snakes of Mexico: Herpetofauna Mexicana Vol. I. Frankfurt am Main, Germany: Edition Chimaira. 572 pp. .
Jan G (1862). "Enumerazione sistematico delle specie d'ofidi del gruppo Calamaridae ". Archivio per la Zoologia l'Anatomia e la Fisiologia 2: 1-76. (Adelphicos quadrivirgatum, new species, p. 19). (in Italian).
McCranie JR (2015). "A checklist of the amphibians and reptiles of Honduras, with additions, comments on taxonomy, some recent taxonomic decisions, and areas of further studies needed". Zootaxa 3931 (3): 352-386.

External links

Adelphicos
Reptiles of Belize
Reptiles of Guatemala
Reptiles of Honduras
Reptiles of Mexico
Reptiles described in 1862
Taxa named by Giorgio Jan